Pasiphila punicea is a moth in the family Geometridae. It is found in New Zealand.

References

External links

Moths described in 1923
punicea
Moths of New Zealand